Lasse Jacobsson (born 10 December 1960, in Jönköping) is a Swedish football manager and former player.

Honours

Managerial
Halmstads BK:
 U21 Allsvenskan: 2009

References

External links
 Hallandsposte.se Artikel 

1960 births
Living people
Swedish footballers
Swedish football managers
Östers IF managers
Halmstads BK managers
IS Halmia managers
Ängelholms FF managers
Mjällby AIF managers
Association footballers not categorized by position
Sportspeople from Jönköping